Scott Wheeler Brumfield (born August 19, 1970) is a former American football player and coach. Brumfield was an offensive guard for the Cincinnati Bengals. He was not drafted, but later signed on to the Bengals as a free-agent in 1996. He played six seasons in the National Football League (NFL). Brumfield suffered a severe spinal-cord injury that left his legs temporarily paralyzed in the third quarter of a game in Baltimore. After requiring the use of crutches to walk for several months, he rehabilitated and returned to play for the Bengals. In 2006, Brumfield joined the coaching staff at Dixie State University and became head football coach of the Red Storm in 2010. On November 9, 2015, Brumfield resigned as Dixie State head coach.

Head coaching record

References

External links
 
 ESPN profile

1970 births
Living people
American football offensive guards
BYU Cougars football players
Cincinnati Bengals players
Utah Tech Trailblazers football coaches
Utah Tech Trailblazers football players
People from Spanish Fork, Utah
Sportspeople from Salt Lake City
Coaches of American football from Utah
Players of American football from Salt Lake City
Ed Block Courage Award recipients